Afar may refer to:

Peoples and languages
Afar language, an East Cushitic language
Afar people, an ethnic group of Djibouti, Eritrea, and Ethiopia

Places

Horn of Africa
Afar Desert or Danakil Desert, a desert in Ethiopia
Afar Region, a regional state of Ethiopia
Afar Triangle or Afar Depression, a geological feature in East Africa
Afar Triple Junction, a geological rift system which divides the Nubian, Somalian, and Arabian plates
French Territory of the Afars and the Issas, a former French colony (now Djibouti)

Iraq
Tal Afar, in Iraq
Tel Afar District, region in Iraq

Arts, entertainment, and media
Afar (album), a synthpop album by Ice Choir
Afar (magazine), a publication focused on experiential travel
Afar, a Combo Rangers character

Organizations
Afar Liberation Front, a former Ethiopian militant group
Afar National Democratic Party, a former Ethiopian political party 
Afar Revolutionary Democratic Unity Front, an Ethiopian political party
 American Federation for Aging Research, or AFAR, a private charitable organization

Language and nationality disambiguation pages